Veazie is a town in Penobscot County, Maine, United States. The population was 1,814 at the 2020 census. The town is named after General Samuel Veazie, an early lumber baron and railroad operator.  Veazie was originally part of Bangor, using Penobscot River water power to operate sawmills.  It became a separate town in 1853 because Gen. Veazie, its wealthiest citizen, thought Bangor's property taxes were too high.

Geography

Demographics

2010 census
As of the census of 2010, there were 1,919 people, 828 households, and 498 families living in the town. The racial makeup of the town was 94.0% White, 0.7% African American, 1.4% Native American, 1.8% Asian, 0.2% from other races, and 1.9% from two or more races. Hispanic or Latino of any race were 1.3% of the population.

There were 828 households, of which 27.1% had children under the age of 18 living with them, 46.0% were married couples living together, 10.1% had a female householder with no husband present, 4.0% had a male householder with no wife present, and 39.9% were non-families. 30.0% of all households were made up of individuals, and 13.1% had someone living alone who was 65 years of age or older. The average household size was 2.31 and the average family size was 2.83.

The median age in the town was 43.4 years. 20.4% of residents were under the age of 18; 9.9% were between the ages of 18 and 24; 21.6% were from 25 to 44; 31.4% were from 45 to 64; and 16.7% were 65 years of age or older. The gender makeup of the town was 47.7% male and 52.3% female.

2000 census
As of the census of 2000, there were 1,744 people, 722 households, and 495 families living in the town. The racial makeup of the town was 96.90% White, 0.11% African American, 0.86% Native American, 1.03% Asian, and 1.09% from two or more races. Hispanic or Latino of any race were 0.57% of the population.

There were 722 households, out of which 29.9% had children under the age of 18 living with them, 54.6% were married couples living together, 11.4% had a female householder with no husband present, and 31.4% were non-families. 24.1% of all households were made up of individuals, and 9.1% had someone living alone who was 65 years of age or older.  The average household size was 2.41 and the average family size was 2.85.

In the town, the population was spread out, with 23.9% under the age of 18, 7.0% from 18 to 24, 27.4% from 25 to 44, 27.2% from 45 to 64, and 14.6% who were 65 years of age or older.  The median age was 40 years. For every 100 females, there were 92.3 males.  For every 100 females age 18 and over, there were 88.4 males.

The median income for a household in the town was $44,519, and the median income for a family was $54,583. Males had a median income of $38,456 versus $29,432 for females. The per capita income for the town was $24,723.  About 5.1% of families and 7.6% of the population were below the poverty line, including 7.9% of those under age 18 and 6.7% of those age 65 or older.

Education 
Veazie Community School teaches children from Pre-Kindergarten through Eighth grade.

In 1896, the town opened its own High School. Following its closure in 1901, students from Veazie attend neighboring High Schools in Bangor or Orono.

Government 
The Town Manager of Veazie is Mark Leonard, who also serves as Chief of the Veazie Police Department.

Veazie is part of the 8th district of the Maine Senate, which is currently represented by Democrat Mike Tipping. The town's representative in the Maine House is Democrat Joseph Perry, who serves the state's 24th district.

References

External links
Town of Veazie official website

Towns in Penobscot County, Maine
Towns in Maine